Staring at the Sun is the eighth studio album by British jazz/funk band Level 42, released in 1988. The album includes the singles "Heaven in My Hands" (UK No. 12), "Take a Look" (UK No. 32) and "Tracie" (UK no. 25).

Background
Staring at the Sun is the first Level 42 album not to feature brothers Phil Gould and Boon Gould, although Boon did write the lyrics to six of the songs. They were replaced by British guitarist Alan Murphy, who had collaborated with Go West and singer Kate Bush, and drummer Gary Husband, who had been a member of the band Morrissey–Mullen. This would be the only Level 42 album on which Murphy would appear, as he died only a year after its release from complications related to HIV/AIDS.

Commercial performance
The album was not as successful as its predecessors, again reaching the Top 5 in the UK Albums Chart but missing the top half of the Billboard 200 in the US. Internationally, it reached the Top 10 in several countries, but ultimately had a lesser impact on the charts than the band's two previous albums.

Track listing 
 "Heaven in My Hands" (King, R. Gould) – 4:39
 "I Don't Know Why" (King, R. Gould) – 4.22
 "Take a Look" (King, R. Gould, Lindup, Badarou) – 4:41
 "Over There" (King, Lindup) – 3:59
 "Silence" (Lindup) – 4:56
 "Tracie" (King, Husband) – 4:53
 "Staring at the Sun" (King, R. Gould, Badarou) – 4:39
 "Two Hearts Collide" (King, R. Gould) – 4:10
 "Man" (King, R. Gould, Badarou) – 7:23
 "Gresham Blues" A (King) – 5:43

A Available on the CD and cassette only

Personnel 

Level 42
 Mark King – bass guitar, vocals
 Mike Lindup – keyboards, vocals
 Alan Murphy – guitars
 Gary Husband – drums
with:
 Wally Badarou – keyboards
 Dominic Miller – guitars
 Krys Mach – saxophones
 Steve Sidwell – trumpet

Production 
 Level 42 – producers
 Wally Badarou – producer 
 Julian Mendelsohn – producer, engineer, mixing 
 Jean Lamoot – assistant engineer 
 Kevin Metcalfe – mastering 
 The Artful Dodgers – sleeve design 
 Mark Hughes – illustration 
 John Stoddart – photography 
 Paul Crockford – management

Chart positions

Album

Singles

Sales and certifications

References 

1988 albums
Level 42 albums
Albums produced by Wally Badarou
Polydor Records albums
Albums produced by Julian Mendelsohn
Albums recorded at Studio Miraval